Unión Deportiva Atlético Gramenet Milán is a Spanish football team based in Santa Coloma de Gramenet, in the autonomous community of Catalonia. Founded in 1945 it currently plays in Segona Catalana – Group 4, holding home games at Municipal de Sant Adrià in Sant Adrià de Besòs, with a capacity of 1,000.

History
UDA Gramenet was founded in 1945, through the merger of three teams from Santa Coloma de Gramenet: FC Gramenet, UD Colomense and CF Baleares. The club first reached the national categories in 1956, and first promoted to the third division 37 years later.

Gramenet finished three times in the top three in its first four seasons, but successively underachieved in the playoffs, against Real Jaén, Ourense and Sestao Sport Club (1993–94), Deportivo Alavés, Jaén and Las Palmas (1994–95) and Jaén, Lemona and Ourense (1996–97). In 1996 the club merged with C.D. Milán, who later became Gramenet B.

In the 2004–05 season, still in the third division, Gramenet could only place 16th in the league, but reached the quarterfinals of the Copa del Rey after ousting FC Barcelona, Levante and Lleida, only being downed by Real Betis (2–2 at home, 3–4 away) who later went on to win the tournament. In the following years the club would only participate once in the promotion playoffs, losing 3–6 on aggregate to Salamanca in 2006.

In 2014, the club was forced by the city hall to leave the Nou Camp Municipal in Santa Coloma de Gramenet and since the 2014–15 season, Gramenet plays its games at Sant Adrià de Besòs.

Background
FC Gramenet - (¿?–1945) → ↓
UD Colomense - (¿?–1945) → UDA Gramenet - (1945–95) → UDA Gramenet Milán (1995–¿?)
CF Baleares - (¿?–1945) → ↑

UD Obreros- (¿?–1995) → ↓
UDA Gramenet - (1945–95) → UDA Gramenet Milán (1995–¿?)
CD Milán- (¿?–1995) → ↑

Season to season

18 seasons in Segunda División B
20 seasons in Tercera División

Famous players
Note: this list includes players that have played at least 100 league games and/or have reached international status.
 Anselmo
 Jacinto Elá
 Oussama Souaidy
 Robert
 Jorge Rojas
 Curro Torres
 Unai Vergara
 Tito Vilanova

See also
UDA Gramenet B, reserve team

References

External links
Official website 
Futbolme team profile 

 
Football clubs in Catalonia
Association football clubs established in 1945
1945 establishments in Spain
Santa Coloma de Gramenet